Bawari may refer to:

 Bawari or Bauria language, a Bhil language of India.
 bawari, or baori, a local Hindu and Urdu term for stepwells in India and Pakistan.